Asemonea maculata is a jumping spider species in the genus Asemonea. The male was first identified in 1980.

Description

Distribution
Asemonea maculata has been found in Ivory Coast.

References

Endemic fauna of Ivory Coast
Invertebrates of West Africa
Salticidae
Spiders described in 1980
Spiders of Africa